A phi' (AΦ) may refer to:
Alkaline phosphatase
Alpha Phi